The Indian Television Academy Awards, also known as the ITA Awards, is an annual award ceremony organised by the Indian Television Academy to honour excellence in Hindi-language television.

Ceremonies

Categories

Popular Awards
 ITA Award for Best Actor Popular 
 ITA Award for Best Actress Popular
 ITA Award for Best Show Popular

Jury Awards: General

Drama 
 ITA Award for Best Actor Drama
 ITA Award for Best Actress Drama
 ITA Award for Best Director - Drama
 ITA award for Best Serial – Drama
 ITA Award for Best Actor in a Supporting Role
 ITA Award for Best Actress in a Supporting Role
 ITA Award for Best Actor in a Negative Role
 ITA Award for Best Actress in a Negative Role
 ITA Award for Best Child Artist

Comedy
 ITA Award for Best Actor - Comedy
 ITA Award for Best Actress - Comedy
 ITA Award for Best Directo Comedy
 ITA Award for Best Serial Comedy

Best Reality Show

Best Anchor - Music/Film Based Show

Best Music/Film Based Show

Best Talk Show Anchor

Best Game Show Host

Best Game Show

Best News Anchor

Best News Show

Best Television Event

Best Interstitial/Filler

Best Mini Series

 Best TV Documentary

Others
 ITA Award for Best Thriller/Horror Serial
 ITA Award for Popular Serial -Special Recognition
Milestone Achievement Award - Crime Patrol (2021)

Jury Awards: Technical

Best Art Direction

Best Costumes

Best Dialogues

Best Editing

Edutainment/Science/Knowledge Based Show

Best TV Picture Editor

Best Public Service Shorts

Best Lyricist

Best Singer

Best Story

Best Teleplay

Best Title Music/Song Track

Best Videography

Best Visual Effects

Special Awards

GR8! Performer of the Year (Male)

GR8! Performer of the Year (Female)

The ITA Scroll Of Honour

Channel Awards

Best Entertainment Channel
2001 - DD Metro
2002 - Star Plus
2003 - Star Plus
2004 - Star Plus
2005 - Star Plus
2006 - Star Plus
2007 - Star Plus
2008 - Star Plus
2009 - Colors TV
2010 - Star Plus
2011 - Star Plus
2012 - Star Plus
2013 - Star Plus
2014 - Star Plus
2015 - Star Plus
2016 - Star Plus
2017 - Star Plus
2020 - Star Plus

Best Hindi News Channel
2001 - Aaj Tak
2002 - Aaj Tak
2003 - Aaj Tak
2004 - Aaj Tak
2005 - Aaj Tak
2006 - Aaj Tak
2007 - Aaj Tak
2008 - Aaj Tak
2009 - Aaj Tak
2010 - Aaj Tak
2011 - Aaj Tak
2012 - Aaj Tak
2013 - Aaj Tak
2014 - Aaj Tak
2015 - Aaj Tak
2016 - India TV
2017 - Aaj Tak
2020 - Aaj Tak

Best English News Channel
2006 - CNN-News18
2007 - CNN-News18
2008 - CNN-News18
2009 - NDTV 24x7
2010 - CNN-News18
2011 - CNN-News18
2012 - CNN-News18
2013 - CNN-News18
 2014 - Times Now
2015 - CNN-News18
2016 - CNN-News18
2017 - India Today
2018 - India Today

See also

 List of Asian television awards

References

 
Indian television awards